Abu Bakar bin Apong is a Bruneian politician whom formerly held the position of Minister of Health (MOH) from 2002 to 2005, Minister of Communications (MOC) from 2005 to 2010, Minister of Education (MOE) from 2010 to 2015, and Minister of Home Affairs (MOHA) from 2015 to 2022. He had served in the government for the second-longest period of time after Pehin Isa Ibrahim.

Notably, he was also the Vice-Chancellor of the Universiti Brunei Darussalam (UBD) from 1991 to 1998, Deputy Chairman of Autoriti Monetari Brunei Darussalam (AMBD) Board of Directors, concurrently the Chairman of the Brunei Investment Agency (BIA) and chairman of the Board of Directors of the Sultan Haji Hassanal Bolkiah Foundation.

Biography

Early life and education 
Abu Bakar is born on 19 September 1948 at Kampong Setia Pahlawan of Kampong Ayer, and educated at Lela Menchanai Malay School (1955–1957); Sultan Muhammad Jamalul Alam Malay School (1957–1957); Sultan Omar Ali Saifuddien Colllege (1958–1968); Bachelor of Arts (Hons) in Malaya (1972); Diploma In Education in Singapore (1974); Master of Arts from the Lancaster (1980). Moreover, he graduated from Leeds University with a Bachelor in Electrical Engineering (BEE), a Master in Public Administration (MPA) from Harvard University, fellow at the Edward S. Mason Program in Public Policy and Management.

Ministerial career 
From 17 May 2002 until 23 May 2005, he became the Minister of Health. He was later appointed as the Minister of Communications on 24 May 2005. During the TELMIN + 1 Sessions with ASEAN Dialogue Partners in 2006, Abu Bakar presided. As well as the Secretary-General of ASEAN, ICT Ministers from ASEAN member nations, China, Japan, South Korea, and India were present.

Abu Bakar was again reappointed as the 5th Minister of Education on 28 May 2010. The fifth Asia-Pacific Economic Cooperation (APEC) Education Ministers Meeting was attended by Abu Bakar, who also paid a working visit to the Republic of Korea from 21 to 23 May 2012. As the 33rd Lee Kuan Yew Exchange Fellow (LKYEF), Abu Bakar will be in Singapore from 1 to 9 April of that same year. Making him the third Bruneian Lee Kuan Yew Exchange Fellow, and would be accompanied by members of the Brunei MOE as well as his wife Jahrah Mohamad. At The Empire Hotel & Country Club in Jerudong, Timor Leste's Minister of Education, Bendito Freitas, and Abu Bakar Apong had a bilateral meeting on 16 March 2014.

On 22 October 2015, Abu Bakar was reappointed for the final time as the 5th Minister of Home Affairs. He remained in his position during the 2018 Cabinet reshuffle which saw the replacing of six ministers. During the 109th International Labour Conference in June 2021, the unemployment rate in Brunei is 6.8%, according to his citation of their 2019 Labour Force Survey. Moreover, the Manpower Planning and Employment Council was founded in 2020, and since then, it has achieved a success rate of 103%, or 12,763 jobseekers employed, increasing local employment to almost four times that of prior years. According to him on 14 May 2022, 1,352 children in the same age range received the COVID-19 vaccine in a second dosage, bringing the total number of second doses given to 8,542, or 20.1%. In the meantime, 68% of the populace as a whole has gotten the third dose of the vaccination. It was during the cabinet reshuffling on 7 June 2022, Sultan Hassanal Bolkiah announced the replacement of eight ministers, including Abu Bakar, therefore replaced by Ahmaddin Abdul Rahman in his position.

Other appointments 
Abu Bakar held several positions early in his career which consisted of an Education Officer in 1972; teaching staff at Paduka Seri Begawan Sultan Malay College and became Principal in 1974; Head of Planning, Research and Guidance Unit, Department of Education (1975–1980); Head of Training Unit, Personnel Office (1980–1981); Senior Administrative Officer in the General Counsel Department of His Majesty the Sultan and Yang Di-Pertuan of Brunei Darussalam (1981–1984); Director of Studies (1984). Other appointments he held while in service with the government consisted of Deputy Vice-Chancellor of UBD (1985–1986); Permanent Secretary of the Prime Minister's Department (1986–1991); UBD Vice Chancellor (1991–1999); Permanent Secretary (Professional) at the Ministry of Education (1999–May 2002).

In June 1994, Vice-Chancellor of the UBD, Abu Bakar, visits Library 1 and the Computer Center at Nanyang Technological University (NTU). Additionally, he attended a dinner hosted by the Vice-Chancellor of the National University of Singapore (NUS), Lim Pin.

Deputy Chairman of AMBD Board of Directors, Abu Bakar, attended the Brunei Darussalam Islamic Capital Market (BICAM) Conference 2018 as the honored guest at the Rizqun International Hotel. According to him, these discussions will offer crucial insights into how we may advance together in offering creative and workable ideas to raise the bar for the Islamic capital market and Islamic finances in general.

Personal life 
Abu Bakar is married to Datin Paduka Hajah Jahrah binti Haji Mohamad. He is also the older brother of Dato Yahya Bakar, former Minister of Energy.

Honours

Abu Bakar was bestowed the title of Yang Berhormat (The Honourable) Pehin Orang Kaya Putera Maharaja on 25 May 1996, and later promoted to Pehin Orang Kaya Seri Kerna on 1 April 2004. Moreover, he has earned the following honours;

Academic 
 Highest Awards of Soka, University of Japan, 1984 
 Honorary Doctorate of Soka, University of Japan, 1998
 Doctor of Education, University of Malaya, 1999
 Honorary Doctorate of Letters, University of Brunei Darussalam, 2007

National 

  Order of Setia Negara Brunei First Class (PSNB) – Dato Seri Setia
  Order of Paduka Seri Laila Jasa Second Class (DSLJ) – Dato Seri Laila Jasa
  Order of Seri Paduka Mahkota Brunei Third Class (SMB)
  Sultan Hassanal Bolkiah Medal (PHBS)
  Medal for Service to State (PIKB)
  Long Service Medal (PKL)
  National Day Silver Jubilee Medal – (23 February 2009)

References

External links 
 Interview with Pehin Dato Abu Bakar Apong

Living people
Government ministers of Brunei
1948 births
Interior ministers of Brunei
Alumni of the University of Leeds
Harvard University alumni
Bruneian Muslims